Rubinstein is a surname of German and Yiddish origin, mostly found among Ashkenazi Jews; it denotes "ruby-stone". Notable persons named Rubinstein include:

A–E
 Akiba Rubinstein (1880–1961), Polish chess grandmaster
 Amnon Rubinstein (born 1931), Israeli scholar, politician and columnist
 Anton Rubinstein (1829–1894), Russian pianist, composer and conductor, brother of Nikolai Rubinstein
 Ariel Rubinstein (born 1951), game theorist at Tel Aviv University and New York University
 Arthur Rubinstein (1887–1982), Polish-American pianist
 Arthur B. Rubinstein (born 1938), American drama and film score composer and conductor
 Benjamin B. Rubinstein (1905–1989), Finnish-born American psychoanalyst
 Benny Rubinstein, Israeli footballer
 Dave Rubinstein (1964–1993), singer in the band Reagan Youth
 David Rubinstein (pianist) (born 1949)
 David Rubinstein (social historian) (born 1932), American-born social historian living in England, specializing in the 19th and 20th centuries
 Elyakim Rubinstein (born 1947), Israeli diplomat, former Attorney General of Israel and vice president of the Supreme Court of Israel
 Erna Rubinstein (1903–1966), Hungarian-American classical violinist

F–J
 Gennadii Rubinstein 
 Gillian Rubinstein (born 1942), English-born Australian author of children's books and for adults as Lian Hearn
 Hadar Rubinstein (born 1967), Israeli Olympic swimmer
 Helena Rubinstein (1872–1965), Polish-born American cosmetics entrepreneur and art collector
 Hilary Rubinstein (1926–2012), British literary agent and publisher
 Ida Rubinstein (1885–1960), Russian dancer with the Ballet Russe in Paris
 Jacob Leon Rubenstein (1911-1967), birth name of Jack Ruby, American nightclub owner who killed Lee Harvey Oswald
 James Rubinstein (1968), public school teacher in Milwaukee and Racine Wisconsin. 
 John Rubinstein (born 1946), American actor, singer, composer, director; son of pianist Arthur Rubinstein
 Jolyon Rubinstein (born 1981), English satirist, director and writer
 Jon Rubinstein (born 1956), American computer scientist and electrical engineer instrumental in the creation of the iPod
 J. Hyam Rubinstein (born 1948), Australian mathematician primarily interested in topology

K–O
 Lev Rubinstein, Russian poet and essayist
 Marcos Rubinstein, Swiss engineer
 Mark Rubinstein, American financial economist and financial engineer
 Michael Rubinstein (born 1973), birth name of Michael Weston, American television and film actor and son of John Rubinstein and Judi West
 Nicolai Rubinstein (1911–2002), Russian historian
 Nikolai Rubinstein (1835–1881), Russian pianist and composer, brother of Anton Rubinstein

P–Z
 Pablo Rubinstein, Chilean doctor who pioneered the preservation and medical use of placenta blood as a form of stem cell technology
 Robert A. Rubinstein (born 1951), American anthropologist
 Robert J. Rubinstein (born 1952), entrepreneur and founder of the TBLI group
 Roman Rubinshteyn (born 1996), Belarusian-Israeli basketball player
 Sergei Rubinstein, Soviet psychologist, critic to Lev Vygotsky
 Seymour I. Rubinstein (born 1934), American software developer
 Susanna Rubinstein (1847–1914), Austrian psychologist
 William Rubinstein (born 1946), British historian
 Yaakov Rubinstein, Israeli violinist
 Zdenka Rubinstein (1911–1961), Croatian operatic soprano
 Zelda Rubinstein (1933–2010), American actress

See also 
 Rubenstein (disambiguation)
 Rubinstein–Taybi syndrome, a genetic disorder
 Ruby (given name)
 Ruby (surname)

References

Jewish surnames
German-language surnames
Yiddish-language surnames
Surnames from ornamental names